This is a list of episodes for the musical variety show Soul Train that aired originally from October 2, 1971, to March 25, 2006. The dates shown are original air dates, but some dates are approximate because in the 1970s, most syndication markets did not get the episodes at the same time, so the dates shown are the first airings of the episodes. This is also a list for the Best of Soul Train reruns that aired from 2006 until the show's cancellation in September 2008. The dates shown are the first airings of the episodes.

Series overview



Season 1 (1971–1972)
Back to Series overview

The first theme song was the 1962 recording of "Hot Potatoes", performed by King Curtis; the song used for the bumpers was "Familiar Footsteps" by Gene Chandler.

Season 2 (1972–1973)
Back to Series overview

Season 3 (1973–1974)
Back to Series overview

Starting with episode 76, the show's theme was changed to "TSOP (The Sound of Philadelphia)", written by Gamble and Huff and performed by MFSB and the Three Degrees.

Season 4 (1974–1975)
Back to Series overview

Season 5 (1975–1976)
Back to Series overview

With the start of this season, Soul Train instituted a new theme: "Soul Train '75" by The Soul Train Gang.

Season 6 (1976–1977)
Back to Series overview

Starting with the ninth episode, Soul Train has a new theme song: "Soul Train '76" by The Soul Train Gang.

Season 7 (1977–1978)
Back to Series overview

Season 8 (1978–1979)
Back to Series overview

Soul Train has a new theme this season, starting with episode 267: "Soul Train Theme '79" by The Hollywood Disco Jazz Band and The Waters.

Season 9 (1979–1980)
Back to Series overview

Starting with episode 319, the theme changed to a prototype of "Up on Soul Train" by The Waters.

Season 10 (1980–1981)
Back to Series overview

Soul Train institutes a new theme: "Up on Soul Train" by R&B group The Whispers.

Season 11 (1981–1982)
Back to Series overview

Season 12 (1982–1983)
Back to Series overview

After Episode 410, production went on hiatus due to Don Cornelius having a major brain surgery, and the show was rerun for 16 weeks. Starting with episode 411, the new theme is "Soul Train's a Comin'" by O'Bryan, which began the new episodes that Don produced upon his return to the show.

Season 13 (1983–1984)
Back to Series overview

At the start of this season, a remixed version of "Soul Train's a Comin' (Party Down)" is used as the theme.

Season 14 (1984–1985)
Back to Series overview

Season 15 (1985–1986)
Back to Series overview

The program moved its taping location to Hollywood Center Studios, from its previous location at the Charlie Chaplin Studios; the show would remain there through season 22.

Season 16 (1986–1987)
Back to Series overview

Season 17 (1987–1988)
Back to Series overview

Soul Train introduces a new theme song: "TSOP '87" by George Duke (vocalized by Howard Hewett).

Season 18 (1988–1989)
Back to Series overview

Season 19 (1989–1990)
Back to Series overview

A remixed version of the theme song, "TSOP '89", is introduced in this season.

Season 20 (1990–1991)
Back to Series overview

Season 21 (1991–1992)
Back to Series overview

Season 22 (1992–1993)
Back to Series overview

Season 22 is Don Cornelius's last season as host.

Season 23 (1993–1994)
Back to Series overview

This season introduced a new theme song, "Soul Train '93 (Know You Like to Dance)", performed by the rap group Naughty by Nature, Chanté Moore, Wallace "Scotty" and Walter Scott of The Whispers, and saxophonist Everette Harp. The new opening animation introduces a revised, afrocentric-inspired Soul Train logo, and features video clips of performances from the show's first 22 seasons playing in floating video boxes in the background. The show is also moved to Paramount Studios, where the show would be filmed right up to the final season. Also for the next four years, the show used a revolving guest-host format.

Season 24 (1994–1995)
Back to Series overview

Season 25 (1995–1996)
Back to Series overview

Season 26 (1996–1997)
Back to Series overview

Season 27 (1997–1998)
Back to Series overview

The revolving guest-host format ends, and Mystro Clark takes over as permanent host at this point.

Season 28 (1998–1999)
Back to Series overview

Season 29 (1999–2000)
Back to Series overview

The 13th episode of this season and the 938th episode of the show marked the first new episode to air in the 21st century, with a major change: Shemar Moore takes over as host, replacing Mystro Clark. Along with Moore's debut, the program gets a new theme: "TSOP 2000" by Dr. Freeze, Samson, and Everette Harp.

Season 30 (2000–2001)
Back to Series overview

Season 31 (2001–2002)
Back to Series overview

Season 32 (2002–2003)
Back to Series overview

This is Shemar Moore's last season as host.

Season 33 (2003–2004)
Back to Series overview

Starting with this season, Dorian Gregory takes over as host.

Season 34 (2004–2005)
Back to Series overview

Season 35 (2005–2006)
Back to Series overview

This is the last season to feature original episodes, and the shortest in the program's run, with only 16 episodes produced and aired.

Season 36 (2006–2007): The Best of Soul Train
Back to Series overview

For two years beginning in the fall of 2006, the program presented archived episodes under the title "The Best of Soul Train".  Fifty-six editions of the show, randomly selected and ranging in a time frame from 1973 through 1988, were re-aired during the 2006–07 and 2007–08 seasons.

Season 37 (2008): The Best of Soul Train
Back to Series overview

At this point, once all of the 56 episodes of The Best of Soul Train had been aired, a select few out of the 56 were reaired again for this season.

By September 22, 2008, the series ceased distribution.

Notes

References

The airdates came from various sources like the Library of Congress files, the U.S. Copyright files, vintage TV Guides, and actual videos of the episodes themselves.

Lists of television episodes